Carlos Hugo, Duke of Parma and Piacenza (8 April 1930 – 18 August 2010) was the head of the House of Bourbon-Parma from 1977 until his death. Carlos Hugo was the Carlist pretender to the throne of Spain and sought to change the political direction of the Carlist movement through the Carlist Party, of which he was the official head during the fatal Montejurra incidents. His marriage to Princess Irene of the Netherlands in 1964 caused a constitutional crisis in the Netherlands.

Background

Carlos Hugo was the son of Xavier, Duke of Parma, and Madeleine de Bourbon-Busset and was baptized Hugues Marie Sixte Robert Louis Jean Georges Benoît Michel. He was a direct male descendant of Louis XIV. On 28 June 1963 he was officially renamed Charles Hugues, by judgment of the court of appeal of la Seine, France. 

In 1977, his father died, and Carlos Hugo succeeded him claiming the thrones of Parma, Etruria and Spain. He was a French citizen, and from 1980, a naturalized Spanish citizen.

He studied in Paris and at the University of Oxford.

Carlism
Carlism is a Spanish political movement founded in the 19th century which, since the second half of the 20th century, upholds the claim of Carlos Hugo's branch of the House of Bourbon to the Spanish throne.

Carlos Hugo assumed Carlist leadership in August 1975. In Francoist Spain, the organization of Carlism has been known as the Traditionalist Communion. After Franco's death, the Carlist movement was split, and unable to get wide public attention again. In May 1976, a year after Franco's death, two Carlist sympathizers were shot down by far-right terrorists during the annual Carlist convocation. Among the terrorists were Stefano Delle Chiaie and members of the Argentine Anticommunist Alliance (Triple A), with logistic support from Francoist elements inside Spanish intelligence agencies and the Civil Guard. This incident became known as the Montejurra massacre.

On 28 September 2003 at Arbonne in France, Carlos Hugo re-asserted his Carlist claim.

Marriage and family 

Carlos Hugo's engagement to Princess Irene of the Netherlands, daughter of Queen Juliana of the Netherlands, caused a constitutional crisis in the Netherlands for several reasons. Irene lost her rights of succession to the Dutch throne because the government refused to enact a law permitting the marriage. Her mother could not go to Madrid to talk Irene out of the marriage and of her conversion to Catholicism because the government advised her against it. The issue that prevented the government from making a law permitting the marriage was Carlos's claim to the Spanish throne. The Dutch government saw international political difficulties arising from a possible heir to the Dutch throne holding a controversial claim to the throne of a foreign state.

Carlos Hugo and Irene were married on 29 April 1964, in the Borghese Chapel at the Basilica di Santa Maria Maggiore in Rome, by Cardinal Paolo Giobbe, the former Apostolic Nuncio to the Netherlands. No other members of the Dutch Royal Family were present; Irene's parents watched the ceremony on television. After the ceremony, Carlos Hugo and Irene had a private audience with Pope Paul VI. They spent their honeymoon in Las Palmas de Gran Canaria, after which they settled in Madrid.

Carlos Hugo and Irene divorced on 26 May 1981. They had four children:

Prince Carlos Javier Bernardo Sixto María, Duke of Parma (27 January 1970). He has a natural son, Carlos Hugo (born 20 January 1997), with Brigitte Klynstra. On 12 June 2010, Prince Carlos married Annemarie Cecilia Gualthérie van Weezel. They have three children:
Princess Luisa of Bourbon-Parme (10 May 2012)
Princess Cecilia of Bourbon-Parme (17 October 2013)
Carlos Enrique Leonard, Hereditary Prince of Bourbon-Parma (24 April 2016)
Princess Margarita María Beatriz of Bourbon Parma (13 October 1972) she married Edwin de Roy van Zuydewijn on 22 September 2001 and they were divorced on 8 November 2006. She remarried Tjalling Siebe ten Cate on 2 May 2008. They have two daughters:
Julia ten Cate (3 September 2008)
Paola ten Cate (25 February 2011)
Prince Jaime Bernardo of Bourbon Parma (13 October 1972); he married Viktoria Cservenyak on 3 October 2013. They have two daughters: 
Princess Zita Clara of Bourbon-Parma (21 February 2014) 
Princess Gloria Irene of Bourbon-Parma (9 May 2016) 
Princess María Carolina Cristina of Bourbon Parma (23 June 1974); she married Albert Alphons Ludgerus Brenninkmeijer on 21 April 2012. They have two children:
Alaïa-Maria Brenninkmeijer (20 May 2014)
Xavier Brenninkmeijer (16 December 2015)

Death

In February 2008 it was revealed that Carlos Hugo was being treated for cancer. On 2 August 2010, he announced, via his official website, that his health was further deteriorating. He died on 18 August 2010 in Barcelona at the age of 80. Carlos Hugo's remains were taken from Barcelona to The Hague and laid in state for family members and close relatives in the Fagel Dome on the estate of the Noordeinde Palace (one of the three official palaces of the Dutch royal family). On 28 August, the body was transported to Parma in Italy and interred in the crypt of the Sanctuary of Santa Maria della Steccata.

Honours

Dynastic honours

Carlos-Hugo claimed the headship of the Constantinian Order of Saint George as hereditary heir to the House of Farnese's Duchy of Parma, the Farnese dukes having been recognised as grand masters of the order in 1699, although in 1706 the church of Rome confirmed the order's grand magistry to the Farnese's heirs (the House of Bourbon since 1731) in accordance with male primogeniture.

 House of Bourbon-Parma: Grand Master of the Parmese Sacred Military Constantinian Order of Saint George
 House of Bourbon-Parma: Grand Master of the Order of Saint Louis for Civil Merit
 House of Bourbon-Parma: Grand Master of the Order of the Legitimidad Proscrita
  House of Bourbon-Parma: Grand Master of the Order of St. George for Military Merit

As a claimant to the throne of Spain, Carlos Hugo also claimed to be the Grand Master of the Spanish Order of the Golden Fleece At his funeral the chain of the Order of the Golden Fleece was put on his coffin, and the prince wore the insignia of the order during his marriage.

Foreign honours
 : Knight Grand Cross of the Order of the Holy Sepulchre
 : Grand Cross of the Order of the House of Orange

Ancestry

References

Bibliography
Robert E. Wilson, "The Claim of Carlos-Hugo de Bourbon-Parma to the Spanish Throne", Background 8 (November 1964): 187–193.

External links

Guardian obituary
Royal House of the Netherlands
Comunión Tradicionalista 
Official website of the House of Bourbon-Parma
his claim to Grand Magistery of the Constantinian Order of St.George, in rivalry against both the Duke of Calabria and the Duke of Castro.

|-

1930 births
2010 deaths
Nobility from Paris
Spanish people of French descent
Carlist pretenders to the Spanish throne
Grand Crosses of the Order of the House of Orange
Pretenders to the throne of Parma
Princes of Parma and Piacenza
Princes of Bourbon-Parma
Italian nobility
Dukes of Spain
Deaths from cancer in Spain
Burials at the Sanctuary of Santa Maria della Steccata
Knights of the Holy Sepulchre
Alumni of the University of Oxford
Navarrese titular monarchs